This is intended to be a complete list of properties and districts listed on the National Register of Historic Places on Manhattan Island, the primary portion of the New York City borough of Manhattan (also designated as New York County, New York), from 14th to 59th Streets.  For properties and districts in other parts of Manhattan, whether on Manhattan Island, other islands within the borough, or the neighborhood of Marble Hill on the North American mainland, see National Register of Historic Places listings in Manhattan. The locations of National Register properties and districts (at least for all showing latitude and longitude coordinates below) may be seen in an online map by clicking on "Map of all coordinates".



Current listings from 14th to 59th Streets

 

|}

See also

County: National Register of Historic Places listings in New York County, New York
State: National Register of Historic Places listings in New York
Municipal: List of New York City Designated Landmarks in Manhattan from 14th to 59th Streets

References
Notes

14 to 59